Eliot Frankel (1923 – February 4, 1990) was a three-time Emmy Award recipient as an NBC producer as well as an academic and educator.

Career
After three years as a reporter for the Newark Evening News, Frankel joined NBC in 1950 as a writer for the Camel News Caravan, hosted by  John Cameron Swayze.

Frankel later was appointed as one of the news editor of The Today Show. In 1956, he went to work for The Huntley-Brinkley Report, where he remained until 1963, when he moved to London to direct the network's European news gathering; remained there until 1966.

Post-NBC
In 1980, Frankel retired from NBC to teach journalism at New York University.

Death
Frankel died of stomach cancer at St. Peter's Medical Center in New Brunswick, New Jersey, aged 67.

External links
 Obituary, nytimes.com; accessed April 10, 2015.

1923 births
1990 deaths
20th-century American educators
Deaths from cancer in New Jersey
Deaths from stomach cancer
Emmy Award winners
New York University faculty